Zinjanab (also Romanized as Zīnjanāb; also known as Zanjenāb) is a village in Sard-e Sahra Rural District, in the Central District of Tabriz County, East Azerbaijan Province, Iran. At the 2006 census, its population was 1,973, in 564 families.

References 

Populated places in Tabriz County